The Postman Strikes Back (alternative known title as The Postman Fights Back in the United Kingdom) is a 1982 Hong Kong action film directed by Ronny Yu and starring Bryan Leung as the titular protagonist who is sent on a mission to deliver a cargo of four mysterious cases to a rebel leader. The film co-stars Chow Yun-fat, Fan Mei-sheng, Yuen Yat-cho, Eddy Ko, Cherie Chung and Kuk Ching-suk.

Cast

External links

The Postman Strikes Back at Hong Kong Cinemagic

1982 films
1982 action films
1982 directorial debut films
1982 martial arts films
1980s Cantonese-language films
Films about violence
Films directed by Ronny Yu
Films set in the 1910s
Films set in China
Films shot in South Korea
Golden Harvest films
Hong Kong action films
Hong Kong martial arts films
Kung fu films
Ninja films
1980s Hong Kong films